Sabina Veit (born December 5, 1985 in Maribor) is a Slovenian sprinter. She set a personal best and an Olympic A-standard time of 22.74 seconds, by winning the 200 metres at the Slovenian Open Athletics Championships, coincidentally in her home city. She also won a bronze medal in the same distance at the 2009 Summer Universiade in Belgrade, finishing her time at 23.34 seconds.

Veit represented Slovenia at the 2008 Summer Olympics in Beijing, where she competed for the women's 200 metres. She ran in the third heat against seven other competitors, including United States' Marshevet Hooker, and four-time Olympian Debbie Ferguson-McKenzie of the Bahamas. She finished the race in fifth place by four hundredths of a second (0.04) behind Cyprus' Eleni Artymata, with a time of 23.62 seconds. Veit, however, failed to advance into the quarterfinals, as she placed thirty-fourth overall, and was ranked below four mandatory slots for the next round. She also tied her overall position with Barbados' Jade Bailey.

References

External links

 
NBC 2008 Olympics profile

Slovenian female sprinters
Living people
Olympic athletes of Slovenia
Athletes (track and field) at the 2008 Summer Olympics
Athletes (track and field) at the 2016 Summer Olympics
Sportspeople from Maribor
1985 births
World Athletics Championships athletes for Slovenia
Universiade medalists in athletics (track and field)
Mediterranean Games silver medalists for Slovenia
Mediterranean Games medalists in athletics
Athletes (track and field) at the 2009 Mediterranean Games
Universiade bronze medalists for Slovenia
Medalists at the 2009 Summer Universiade
Olympic female sprinters